The 2002 Cork Junior A Hurling Championship was the 105th staging of the Cork Junior A Hurling Championship since its establishment by the Cork County Board in 1895. The championship began on 28 September 2002 and ended on 17 November 2002.

On 17 November 2002, Ballinhassig won the championship following a 2–12 to 3–07 defeat of Fr. O'Neill's in the final at Páirc Uí Chaoimh. This was their third championship title in the grade.

Luke Swayne was the championship's top scorer with 4-16.

Qualification

Results

First round

Semi-finals

Final

Championship statistics

Top scorers

Overall

In a single game

References

Cork Junior Hurling Championship
Cork Junior Hurling Championship